Stephen John Foster (born 18 September 1980) is a retired  English footballer.

Career
Born in Warrington, Cheshire, Foster signed for local club Crewe Alexandra as a trainee in August 1997 and made his debut just over a year later in Crewe's 1–0 loss at Bury on 22 August 1998. He made his second appearance the following month in Crewe's 1–1 draw at Bristol City on 16 September 1998. Foster played no first team games for Crewe during the 1999–2000 season, but started the following season by scoring his first goal for Crewe, in the 84th minute of a 2–2 draw with Bury on 22 August 2000 (Mark Rivers scored Crewe's second goal two minutes later). It took four seasons before Foster received his first red card - in Crewe's 2–1 loss at Gresty Road against Oldham Athletic on 29 December 2002. He ultimately played 242 first team games for Crewe, scoring 18 goals.

After Crewe's relegation from the Championship in the 2005–06 season, Foster, who was out of contract, turned down a new offer by Crewe in favour of joining Championship side Burnley on a free transfer in June 2006. His time at Burnley were spent mainly as a squad player or substitute, making just 20 first team appearances in 14 months.

In August 2007 Foster was transferred to Barnsley for £100,000, signing a two-year contract, after they tracked him throughout the summer.

Foster made a positive start to his Barnsley career, enjoying a regular run in the team at right-back, though he was sent off after two bookable offences during the 3–3 draw with Stoke City at Oakwell on Boxing Day 2007. On 5 January 2008, Foster scored his first Barnsley goal in an FA Cup third round tie against Blackpool, back-heeling the ball after a corner. He then scored a headed goal from Martin Devaney's cross against Liverpool at Anfield in a 5th round match on 16 February 2008 that Barnsley won 2–1. He bagged his first league goal for Barnsley at Watford in a 3–0 win on 9 April 2008, heading home Diego León's corner. Foster was voted by fans as Barnsley's player of the season for 2007–2008, ahead of club captain Brian Howard and winger Jamal Campbell-Ryce, second and third respectively.

Foster was appointed Barnsley club captain until the start of the 2010/11 season when the captaincy was passed to new signing Jason Shackell to enable Foster to concentrate on his own game. In six season at Oakwell, he played 244 games for Barnsley, scoring 18 goals.

Foster then joined Tranmere in June 2013 on a two-year deal, but played just four games for Rovers before the 32-year-old's contract was terminated by mutual consent in February 2014.

Career statistics

A.  The "League" column constitutes appearances and goals (including those as a substitute) in the Football League.
B.  The "Other" column constitutes appearances and goals (including those as a substitute) in the Football League Trophy.

References

External links

1980 births
Living people
Footballers from Warrington
English footballers
Association football defenders
Crewe Alexandra F.C. players
Burnley F.C. players
Barnsley F.C. players
Tranmere Rovers F.C. players
English Football League players